Mandoul is one of the 23 regions of Chad. Located in the south of the country, it comprises part of the former prefecture of Moyen-Chari. The regional capital is Koumra.

Geography
The region borders Tandjilé Region to the north-west, Moyen-Chari Region to the east, the Central African Republic to the south, and Logone Oriental Region to the west.

Settlements
Koumra the regional capital; other major settlements include Bébopen, Béboro, Bédaya, Bédjondo, Békamba, Békourou, Béssada, Bouna, Dembo, Goundi, Moïssala, Mouroum Goulaye, Ngangara and Peni.

Demography
The population of Mandoul is 628,065 inhabitants, as per the Chadian census of 2009. The main ethnolinguistic groups are the Day, Doba peoples (speaking the closely related Bedjond, Mango and Gor languages), Gulay, Lutos, Mbay, Ndam, Sara and Tumak.

Economy
The main products are subsistence agriculture and cotton.

Subdivisions
The region of Mandoul is divided into three departments:

References

 
Regions of Chad